Tyree Bernard Davis (born September 23, 1970 in Altheimer, Arkansas) is a former professional American football wide receiver. He was drafted by the Tampa Bay Buccaneers in the seventh round of the 1993 NFL Draft. He played college football at Central Arkansas.

Davis has also played for the Barcelona Dragons, Seattle Seahawks and Montreal Alouettes.

References

1970 births
Living people
People from Jefferson County, Arkansas
Players of American football from Arkansas
American football wide receivers
Central Arkansas Bears football players
Tampa Bay Buccaneers players
Barcelona Dragons players
Seattle Seahawks players
Montreal Alouettes players